Hylte/Halmstad VBK is a volleyball club in Halmstad, Sweden, established in 1980. The club won the Swedish men's national championship in 1995, 1996 2000, 2001, 2005, 2006, 2013 and 2018. The women's team won the Swedish national championship in 2014.

Team Roster

2018/2019
Head coach:  Per-Erik Dahlqvist

References

External links
Official website 
Outdated website 

1980 establishments in Sweden
Sport in Halland County
Volleyball clubs established in 1980
Swedish volleyball clubs